A tree throw or tree hole is a bowl-shaped cavity or depression created in the subsoil by a tree.

They are formed either by the long-term presence and growth of tree roots or when a large tree is blown over or has its stump pulled out which tears out a quantity of soil along with the roots. The resultant hole will often slowly fill with organic material and can be identified during archaeological fieldwork.

Fresh tree throws also provide a degree of shelter amongst the roots for animals. Some also contain evidence of prehistoric human activity such as flint tools suggesting that they were sometimes used by people in the distant past.

Tree throws expose humus-poor, mineral-rich soil. Over time the hole will fill with rain water, fallen leaves, animal excrement and other organic matter which over time becomes a habitat for decomposers which soon form a community on the thick organic layer and so are able to nurture certain types of organisms.

Pits from tree throws, together with mounds from decaying fallen trees, are part of the characteristic topography of old growth forest.

See also
Nest box
Reverse stratigraphy
Snag
Stonehenge
Tree hollow

References

Archaeological features
Soil science